Irma Arguello is an international security expert from Argentina. She founded and chairs the Nonproliferation for Global Security Foundation, (NPSGlobal), a private, non-profit initiative oriented to help reduce risks derived from the proliferation and use of armaments, with a special emphasis on weapons of mass destruction. The organization is also devoted to building up adequate and opportune responses to such threats at all levels, in order to increase global security.

She has undertaken work on creating links among different international fields to carry forward the ideas that inspired the organization, especially the vision of a more secure world, without the so-called Weapons of Mass Destruction. Towards that end,  she led the Foundation to the development and design of several strategies, proposals and actions devoted to fulfill its institutional objectives. Under her pioneer leadership, the NPSGlobal Foundation became a non-governmental voice in this field, from Latin America to the world.

Education
Arguello has a degree in Physics Science from the University of Buenos Aires, including a master's degree in Business Administration from IDEA/Wharton School as well as completed Defense and Security studies (Master level) at the Escuela de Defensa Nacional, Argentina.

Career 
Her broad knowledge of nuclear issues related with her vast working experience led her after her graduation, to work as a scientist at the CNEA (National Atomic Energy Commission of Argentina) for the LPR (Laboratory of Radio-chemical Processes Project), which included the design of an Argentine reprocessing plant located in Ezeiza, outside Buenos Aires City.

In the private sector, she has held managerial positions in multinational companies such as in the Latin American Petrochemical Association and in ExxonMobil Corporation, where she was focussed on strategic planning, business analysis, communications and human resources.

In addition to her activities in NPSGlobal (Institution where she is the Chief of the postgraduate course in international security, disarmament and  Non-proliferation), she is the Head of the Secretariat of the Latin American and Caribbean Leadership Network for Nuclear Disarmament and Nonproliferation, an organization which congregates prominent high-level former state-persons and leaders in the region in order to influence the definition of state policies to propose measures to reduce global/regional nuclear risks.

Membership

She is member of the Steering Committee of Fissile Materials Working Group, a non-governmental coalition of over 70 organizations from around the world which are committed to improving fissile material security and the prevention of nuclear terrorism.

Since 2010, she organized and participated as a speaker at all official no-governmental events that were held as part of the Nuclear Security Summits that congregated more than 50 heads of state: In 2010, Washington: 2012, Seoul; 2014, The Nertherlands and 2016, Washington.

She is also a member of the Nuclear Security Governance Expert Group - integrated by globally diverse experts devoted to propose improvements in the global nuclear security regime.

Among other affiliations, she is also member of the Chatham House as an Associate Fellow, world-famous think-tank in London, where she is involved in nuclear disarmament and cyber security projects. She also forms part of the Consultative Committee of the PIR Center International Expert Group.

She participated in the  World Economic Forum's Council in Nuclear Security in the period 2014-2016, the Forum sought a better understanding and the catalyzation of the global, regional and industry transformation.

Arguello is usually appointed to speak before different audiences and has written many articles, papers and Op-Eds relating to her fields of expertise and is usually called to speak at international events and communication media.

Further reading 
 "A World Free of Nuclear Weapons", by George P. Shultz, William J. Perry, Henry A. Kissinger and Sam Nunn, for The Wall Street Journal, January 2007.
 Toward a Nuclear-Free World, by George P. Shultz, William J. Perry, Henry A. Kissinger and Sam Nunn, for The Wall Street Journal, January 2008.

Year of birth missing (living people)
Living people
Place of birth missing (living people)
Wharton School of the University of Pennsylvania alumni
Argentine activists
Argentine women activists
Argentine scientists